State Highway 8 (West Bengal) is a state highway in West Bengal, India.

Route
SH 8 originates from Santaldih and passes through Cheliyama, Raghunathpur, Santuri,  Saltora, Chhatna, Bankura, Beliatore, Sonamukhi, Patrasayer, Khandaghosh, Mirzapur, Kurmun, Kusumgram, Nadanghat, Krishnanagar and Krishnaganj before terminating at Majhdia, a village with a railway station on the Gede branch line, near India-Bangladesh border.

The total length of SH 8 is 292 km.

Districts traversed by SH 8 are:
Purulia district (0 – 58 km)Bankura district (58 – 170 km)Purba Bardhaman district (170 – 196 km)Nadia district (196 – 292 km)

Road sections
It is divided into different sections as follows:

See also
List of state highways in West Bengal

References

State Highways in West Bengal